Phreak Phantasy is an Album by Marshmallow Coast and their 7th Album in total.

Track listing

References 

2009 albums
Marshmallow Coast albums